Alfred James Wilmott (1888–1950) was primarily an English botanist and museum curator. His author standard form is Wilmott and his area of interest was spermatophytes.

His father was an academic who taught at Homerton Training College. Wilmott entered St John's College, Cambridge and graduated from University in 1910. His mentor was Charles Edward Moss. Wilmott had an interest in Salicornia and did much work for the Natural History Museum. Although botany and museum work was his career he also played table tennis receiving the title for the Veteran Singles Champion in 1934-1935. In table tennis he also introduced a method for testing table tennis balls.

References 

Employees of the Natural History Museum, London
English botanists
Alumni of St John's College, Cambridge
English male table tennis players
1888 births
1950 deaths